Mulshi Pattern is a 2018 Indian Marathi-language action crime film directed by Pravin Tarde and produced by Abhijeet Bhosale, Genuine Production and Punit Balan Entertainment. The film stars Pravin Tarde, Om Bhutkar, Mohan Joshi, Upendra Limaye. The film is based on events that happened in Mulshi, Pune and portrays the hardships faced by farmers and their links to the criminal world. The film was released on 23 November 2018. A Hindi-language remake of the film released on 26 November 2021, titled Antim: The Final Truth.

Plot 
The film opens with the gangster Rahul Patil a.k.a. Rahulya cremating his childhood friend and partner in crime Ganesh a.k.a. Ganya, after his murder at the hands of their rival gang. The rival gang, led by Daya and Pitya, then chases Rahulya through the streets of Pune. Through a series of flashbacks, the film shows how Rahulya ended up becoming a gangster.

Sakharam Patil (Rahul's father), a farmer, is forced to sell his land. Rahul feels that his family have lost their dignity. Sakharam then works as a watchman at a builder's bungalow but gets fired and insulted after accidentally damaging his car. Along with Rahul's friend Ganya, the family moves to Mulshi to work as laborers. Rahul refuses to work because he blames his father for the family's troubles. Later, Rahul falls in love with Dipali, the daughter of the head laborer. One morning Rahul angrily beats up and kills a contractor who abused his father, attracting the attention of local gangster Nanya Bhai who invites Rahul to work for him. Rahul and Ganya both start to work for Bhai. Rahul then learns that it was Nanya Bhai who forced Rahul's father to lose his land. In revenge, Rahul kills him and takes control of the gang. The murder of Nanya Bhai starts a war among the gang members.

Rahul tries to take control over all the lands and businesses built on the lands of Mulshi by corporates, making other gangs angry. Newly employed Inspector Vitthal Kadu (Upendra Limaye) decides to let the gangs kill each other in order to reduce crime. Rahul befriends a small boy and gives him a gun to use in emergencies. Rahul then tries to marry Dipali, but she refuses because he is a gangster. When reunited with his family, he learns that other family members have been earning an honest living doing domestic chores while he enjoyed the profits of crime. When Rahul tells Sakharam to laugh once more, his father responds that Rahul's job has taken his joy away. Eventually, the rival gangs unite to defeat Rahul. Rahul's gang grows weak, and many of his gang members get killed, including Ganya.

The film shifts to the present day where he must attempt to escape from rival gangs. When he seeks help from the boy he befriended, the boy abruptly shoots him upon arriving. As Rahul dies, he learns that the boy's family lost their land to Rahul's gang and that the boy had planned his murder all along. Upon hearing the news of Rahul's death, his father finally laughs out, finally getting the joy of knowing that his son is now no longer a gangster.

Cast 

 Om Bhutkar as Rahul "Rahulya" Patil
 Kshitish Date as Ganya
 Mohan Joshi as Sakharam Patil, Rahul's father
 Savita Malpekar as Dhurpi Patil, Rahul's mother
 Dipti Dhotre as Mangal Patil, Rahul's sister
 Pravin Tarde as Nanya Bhai
 Upendra Limaye as Inspector Vitthal Kadu
 Mahesh Manjrekar as Shirpya, Dipali's father
 Malvika Gaekwad as Dipali
 Sunil Abhyankar as the Lawyer
 Suresh Vishwakarma as Uday
 Devendra Gaikwad as Daya
 Ramesh Pardeshi as Pitya Bhai
 Ajay Purkar as Builder Shinde

Release
Mulshi Pattern was theatrically released on 23 November 2018. The film is currently streaming with English subtitles on ZEE5.

Remakes
In 2020, Tarde revealed the film was being remade in Tamil, Telugu and Kannada languages, and that he was working with actor Dev Gill. The film was remade in Hindi as Antim: The Final Truth and released in 2021.

References

External links
 

2018 films
2010s Marathi-language films
Marathi films remade in other languages
Indian gangster films
Indian crime drama films